Ram Bahadur Chettri (15 February 1937 – 4 December 2000) was an Indian footballer. He competed in the men's tournament at the 1960 Summer Olympics. He appeared with Calcutta Football League club East Bengal and captained the team in 1960–61.

Honours
East Bengal
IFA Shield: 1958

India
Asian Games Gold medal: 1962
AFC Asian Cup runners-up: 1964

Individual
 East Bengal Best Midfielder of the Millennium

References

External links
 
 Legends of Indian Football: Ram Bahadur Chhetri at The Hard Tackle

1937 births
2000 deaths
Footballers from Uttarakhand
Sportspeople from Dehradun
Indian Gorkhas
Indian footballers
India international footballers
1964 AFC Asian Cup players
Olympic footballers of India
Footballers at the 1960 Summer Olympics
East Bengal Club players
Association football midfielders
Medalists at the 1962 Asian Games
Footballers at the 1962 Asian Games
Asian Games gold medalists for India
Asian Games medalists in football
Calcutta Football League players